Seaside, formerly East Monterey, is a city in Monterey County, California, United States, with a population of 32,366 as of the 2020 census. Also on the site are the Bayonet and Black Horse golf courses, now open to the public and host to PGA Tour events, including the 2012 PGA Professional National Championship. Seaside is the gateway to Fort Ord National Monument, created on April 20, 2012.

History

Seaside, then called East Monterey, was laid out in 1888 by Dr. J.L.D. Roberts. The Seaside post office opened in 1891. Seaside was incorporated in 1954.

Geography
It is bordered to the north by Marina, to the west by Sand City, to the southwest by Monterey, and to the south by Del Rey Oaks. The California State Route 1 freeway runs along the western border of the city, north of Sand City.

Climate
The climate is a cool Mediterranean type, strongly influenced by the prevailing winds from the west, which blow over the Pacific Coast's cool ocean currents from Alaska.

This region experiences warm (but not hot) and dry summers, with no average monthly temperatures above .  According to the Köppen Climate Classification system, Seaside has a warm-summer Mediterranean climate, abbreviated "Csb" on climate maps.

Law and government
The City of Seaside is a General Law City with a Council/Manager form of government. The five-member City Council is a legislative and policy-making body that is elected on a nonpartisan basis to represent the residents of Seaside.

The City Manager is appointed by the City Council to manage the daily operations of the city and is responsible for making policy recommendations to the City Council and implementing City Council policy directives.

Policy decisions are made at City Council meetings, which are held on the first and third Thursdays of each month at 7:00 p.m. in the City Council Chambers at City Hall, with special meetings as needed. At these public meetings, the City Council makes policy determinations; approves agreements and contracts; adopts ordinances (local laws) and regulations; and authorizes the expenditure of City funds. The City Council also serves as the board of directors for the Redevelopment Agency of the City Council. Meetings of the Redevelopment Agency are typically held prior to the City Council Meetings.

Demographics

2010
At the 2010 census Seaside had a population of 33,025. The racial makeup of Seaside was 15,978 (48.4%) White, 2,783 (8.4%) African American, 347 (1.1%) Native American, 3,206 (9.7%) Asian, 529 (1.6%) Pacific Islander, 7,579 (22.9%) from other races, and 2,603 (7.9%) from two or more races. Hispanic or Latino of any race were 14,347 persons (43.4%).

The census reported that 31,898 people (96.6% of the population) lived in households, 1,127 (3.4%) lived in non-institutionalized group quarters, and no one was institutionalized.

There were 10,093 households, 4,408 (43.7%) had children under the age of 18 living in them, 5,232 (51.8%) were opposite-sex married couples living together, 1,433 (14.2%) had a female householder with no husband present, 708 (7.0%) had a male householder with no wife present. There were 727 (7.2%) unmarried opposite-sex partnerships, and 70 (0.7%) same-sex married couples or partnerships. 1,927 households (19.1%) were one person and 697 (6.9%) had someone living alone who was 65 or older. The average household size was 3.16. There were 7,373 families (73.1% of households); the average family size was 3.57.

The age distribution was 8,923 people (27.0%) under the age of 18, 4,428 people (13.4%) aged 18 to 24, 10,154 people (30.7%) aged 25 to 44, 6,675 people (20.2%) aged 45 to 64, and 2,845 people (8.6%) who were 65 or older. The median age was 30.6 years. For every 100 females, there were 100.5 males. For every 100 females age 18 and over, there were 99.8 males.

There were 10,872 housing units at an average density of 1,159.6 per square mile, of the occupied units 4,183 (41.4%) were owner-occupied and 5,910 (58.6%) were rented. The homeowner vacancy rate was 2.2%; the rental vacancy rate was 4.9%. 11,979 people (36.3% of the population) lived in owner-occupied housing units and 19,919 people (60.3%) lived in rental housing units.

2000
At the 2000 census there were 31,696 people in 9,833 households, including 7,394 families, in the city. The racial makeup of the city was 49.21% White, 12.61% African American, 1.04% Native American, 10.09% Asian, 1.29% Pacific Islander, 18.41% from other races, and 7.34% from two or more races. Hispanic or Latino of any race were 34.48%.

Of the 9,833 households 42.2% had children under the age of 18 living with them, 54.8% were married couples living together, 13.9% had a female householder with no husband present, and 24.8% were non-families. 18.1% of households were one person and 6.7% were one person aged 65 or older. The average household size was 3.21 and the average family size was 3.59.

The age distribution was 30.2% under the age of 18, 11.1% from 18 to 24, 34.4% from 25 to 44, 15.8% from 45 to 64, and 8.5% 65 or older. The median age was 30 years. For every 100 females, there were 103.7 males. For every 100 females age 18 and over, there were 101.6 males.

The median income for a household in the city was $41,393, and the median family income  was $43,259. Males had a median income of $29,204 versus $26,424 for females. The per capita income for the city was $15,183. About 9.3% of families and 12.1% of the population were below the poverty line, including 14.9% of those under age 18 and 7.4% of those age 65 or over.

Education
Seaside High School is home to the 2006 CCS Small-Division Football Championship winners, the Spartans, led by coaches Alfred Avila, Quentin Crosby, Michael Drain, Jeff Quenga, Matt Avila, Pastor Joe Kamp, and Bryan Shaw. The football game between county rival Monterey High School attracts nearly 5,000 people every year. Ron Rivera, head coach of the NFL's Washington Commanders and former linebacker for the Chicago Bears, was a 1980 graduate of Seaside High School.

California State University, Monterey Bay is located in Seaside near Fort Ord and is the second newest campus after CSU Channel Islands. Seaside is also home to Monterey College of Law, a private law school.

Monterey Peninsula College has public safety training center in Seaside that includes a fire and police academy.

Economy
The Defense Manpower Data Center has an office in Seaside, on the former Fort Ord.

Scribble Hill
Scribble Hill (also known as "Message Mountain") is part of Seaside's popular culture. It is a large sand dune near the junction of Fremont Boulevard and State Route 1, technically in Sand City, but adjacent to Seaside High School. People write messages on the dune with ice plant. It is a popular place for birthday messages, wedding proposals, and congratulation messages. Many people climb atop it to view fireworks on 4 July. It is also known as "The Big Dune" or "The Dune" or "The Big Sand Hill" or "The Sand Board".

Bayonet and Black Horse golf courses
Bayonet Golf Course, designed in 1954, was built on the Fort Ord military base. It was named after the Army's 7th Infantry division. The course was allegedly designed to play to then-commanding officer Major General Robert B. McClure's terrible slice, and thus has a series of holes nicknamed "Combat Corner" with substantial doglegs. Black Horse, named after the 11th Cavalry, followed in 1964. Until 1997, the golf courses were only open to members of the military; in 1997 it was purchased by the City of Seaside and opened to the public. After several years of renovation, the courses now meet USGA specifications, and have one new and eight redesigned holes. In 2012, these two courses hosted the PGA Professional National Championship Both Bayonet and Black Horse overlook Monterey Bay, and are par 72 courses.

Notable people
 Jamaree Bouyea, basketball player
 Tony Curtis, professional football player
 Herman Edwards, football coach
 Mason Foster, professional football player
 Mike Gravel, U.S. senator from Alaska
 Charlie Harraway, professional football player
 Melvin T. Mason, city councilman and 1984 presidential candidate (SWP)
 Rachel Roy, fashion designer

References

External links

 

Cities in Monterey County, California
Monterey Bay
Populated coastal places in California
Populated places established in 1888
1888 establishments in California
Populated places established in 1954
1954 establishments in California
Incorporated cities and towns in California